Marshalljohnstonia is a genus of Mexican flowering plants in the tribe Cichorieae within the family Asteraceae.

Species
There is only one known species,  Marshalljohnstonia gypsophila, native to the State of Coahuila in northern Mexico.

References

Cichorieae
Monotypic Asteraceae genera
Flora of Coahuila